The 2008 NHL Entry Draft was the 46th NHL Entry Draft. It was hosted by the Ottawa Senators at Scotiabank Place in the city of Ottawa, Ontario, on June 20–21, 2008. The Senators were originally awarded the 2005 NHL Entry Draft, but because of the lockout, that draft was scaled back significantly from its usual format of being open to the public and having many draft-eligible players in attendance. The actual 2005 drafting was held in Ottawa's Westin Hotel instead of the Corel Centre, as Canadian Tire Centre was then known. As a result of 2005's abridged draft, Ottawa was compensated with the 2008 draft.

Draft weekend

The draft was part of a festival of events that Ottawa and the NHL presented at the Scotiabank Place arena. Before the first round and during the later rounds, the patio outside the main doors was the site of the 'Senators Fan Fest', with hockey games and music. Indoors, the NHL presented an exhibit of NHL trophies, including the Stanley Cup. A hockey card and memorabilia sale was also held.

Draft lottery
The 2008 draft lottery was held April 7. The Tampa Bay Lightning retained the first overall selection. There were no changes from the reverse order of finish of the 2007–08 NHL season.

Final rankings
Source: NHL Central Scouting Bureau staff.

Selections by round
Club teams are located in North America unless otherwise noted.

Round one

Notes
The New York Islanders' first-round pick went to the Toronto Maple Leafs as the result of a trade on June 20, 2008 that sent conditional second and third-round picks in either 2008 or 2009 to New York in exchange for this pick. 
The Toronto Maple Leafs' first-round pick went to the Nashville Predators as the result of a trade on June 20, 2008 that sent a first-round pick in 2008 (9th overall) and Florida's second-round pick in 2008 (40th overall) to the New York Islanders in exchange for this pick.
New York previously acquired this pick as the result of a trade on June 20, 2008 that sent a first-round pick in 2008 (5th overall) to Toronto in exchange for conditional second and third-round picks in either 2008 or 2009
The Florida Panthers' first-round pick went to the New York Islanders as the result of to a trade on June 20, 2008 that sent a first-round pick 2008 (7th overall) to Nashville in exchange for Florida's second-round pick in 2008 (40th overall) and this pick.
Nashville previously acquired this pick as the result of a trade on June 22, 2007 that sent Tomas Vokoun to Florida in exchange for Detroit's second-round pick in 2007, a conditional second-round pick in 2007 or 2008 and this pick.
The Edmonton Oilers' first-round pick went to the Buffalo Sabres as the result of a trade on June 20, 2008 that sent a first-round pick in 2008 (13th overall) and a third-round pick in 2009 to Los Angeles in exchange for this pick.
Los Angeles previously acquired this pick as the result of a trade on June 20, 2008 that sent Calgary and Dallas' first-round picks in 2008 (17th and 28th overall) to Anaheim in exchange for this pick.
Anaheim previously acquired this pick as compensation for not matching an offer sheet from Edmonton to restricted free agent Dustin Penner on August 2, 2007.
The Buffalo Sabres' first-round pick went to the Los Angeles Kings as the result of a trade on June 20, 2008 that sent Edmonton's first-round pick in 2008 (12th overall) to Buffalo in exchange for a third-round pick in 2009 and this pick.
The Nashville Predators' first-round pick went to the Ottawa Senators as the result of a trade on June 20, 2008 that sent a first-round pick in 2008 (18th overall) and a third-round pick in 2009 to Nashville in exchange for this pick.
The Calgary Flames' first-round pick went to the Anaheim Ducks as the result of a trade on June 20, 2008 that sent Edmonton's first-round pick in 2008 (12th overall) to Los Angeles in exchange for Dallas' first-round pick in 2008 (28th overall) and this pick.
Los Angeles previously acquired this pick as the result of a trade on June 20, 2008 that sent Michael Cammalleri to Calgary in exchange for this pick.
The Ottawa Senators' first-round pick went to the Nashville Predators as the result of a trade on June 20, 2008 that sent a first-round pick in 2008 (15th overall) to Ottawa in exchange for a third-round pick in 2009 and this pick.
The Colorado Avalanche's first-round pick went to the Philadelphia Flyers as the result of a trade on June 20, 2008 that sent R. J. Umberger and a fourth-round pick in 2008 (118th overall) to Columbus in exchange for a third-round pick in 2008 (67th overall) and this pick.
Columbus previously acquired this pick as the result of a trade on February 26, 2008 that sent Adam Foote to Colorado in exchange for a conditional fourth-round pick in 2009 and this pick (being conditional at the time of the trade). The condition – Colorado qualifies for the 2008 Stanley Cup playoffs – was converted.
The New Jersey Devils' first-round pick went to the Washington Capitals as the result of a trade on June 20, 2008 that sent a first and second-round pick in 2008 (23rd and 54th overall) to New Jersey in exchange for this pick.
The Anaheim Ducks' first-round pick went to the Edmonton Oilers as the result of a trade on July 3, 2006 that sent Chris Pronger to Anaheim in exchange for Joffrey Lupul, Ladislav Smid, a first-round pick in 2007, a second-round pick in 2008 and this pick (being conditional at the time of the trade). The condition – Edmonton will receive a first-round pick in 2008 if Anaheim reaches the 2007 Stanley Cup Finals – was converted on May 22, 2007.
The Washington Capitals' first-round pick went to the Minnesota Wild as the result of a trade on June 20, 2008 that sent a first-round pick in 2008 (24th overall) and a third-round pick in 2009 to New Jersey in exchange for this pick.
New Jersey previously acquired this pick as the result of a trade on June 20, 2008 that sent a first-round pick in 2008 (21st overall) to Washington in exchange for a second-round pick in 2008 (54th overall) and this pick.
The Minnesota Wild's first-round pick went to the New Jersey Devils as the result of a trade on June 20, 2008 that sent Washington's first-round pick in 2008 (23rd overall) to Minnesota in exchange for a third-round pick in 2009 and this pick.
The Montreal Canadiens' first-round pick went to the Calgary Flames as the result of a trade on June 20, 2008 that sent Alex Tanguay and a fifth-round pick in 2008 (138th overall) to Montreal in exchange for a second-round pick in 2009 and this pick.
The San Jose Sharks' first-round pick went to the Buffalo Sabres as the result of a trade on February 26, 2008 that sent Brian Campbell and a seventh-round pick in 2008 to San Jose in exchange for Steve Bernier and this pick.
 The Philadelphia Flyers' first-round pick went to the Washington Capitals as the result of a trade on June 20, 2008 that sent Steve Eminger and a third-round pick in 2008 (84th overall) to Philadelphia in exchange for this pick.
The Dallas Stars' first-round pick went to the Phoenix Coyotes as the result of a trade on June 20, 2008 that sent two second-round picks in 2008 (35th and 39th overall) to Anaheim in exchange for this pick. 
Anaheim previously acquired this pick as the result of a trade on June 20, 2008 that sent Edmonton's first-round pick in 2008 (12th overall) to Los Angeles in exchange for Calgary's first-round pick in 2008 (17th overall) and this pick.
Los Angeles previously acquired this pick as the result of a trade on February 27, 2007 that sent Mattias Norstrom, Konstantin Pushkaryov, a third-round pick in 2007 and a fourth-round pick in 2007 to Dallas in exchange for Jaroslav Modry, Johan Fransson, a second-round pick in 2007, a third-round pick in 2007 and this pick.
The Pittsburgh Penguins' first-round pick went to the Atlanta Thrashers as the result of a trade on February 26, 2008 that sent Marian Hossa and Pascal Dupuis to Pittsburgh in exchange for Colby Armstrong, Erik Christensen, Angelo Esposito and this pick.

Round two

Notes
The Tampa Bay Lightning's second-round pick went to the Florida Panthers as the result of a trade on June 13, 2007 that sent Chris Gratton to Tampa Bay in exchange for this pick (being conditional at the time of the trade). The condition and date of conversion are unknown.
The Atlanta Thrashers' second-round pick went to the St. Louis Blues as the result of a trade on February 25, 2007, that sent Keith Tkachuk to Atlanta in exchange for Glen Metropolit, a first and third-round pick in 2007, a conditional first-round pick in 2008 and this pick.
The Phoenix Coyotes' compensatory second-round pick went to the Anaheim Ducks as the result of a trade on June 20, 2008 that sent Dallas' first-round pick in 2008 (28th overall) to Phoenix in exchange for a second-round pick in 2008 (39th overall) and this pick.
Phoenix previously acquired this pick as compensation for not signing 2004 first-round draft pick Blake Wheeler.
The Toronto Maple Leafs' second-round pick went to the Nashville Predators as the result of a trade on June 21, 2008 that sent a second and third-round pick in 2008 (46th and 76th overall) to Phoenix in exchange for this pick.
Phoenix previously acquired this pick as the result of a trade on February 27, 2007 that sent Yanic Perreault and a fifth-round draft pick in 2008 to Toronto in exchange for Brendan Bell and this pick.
The Phoenix Coyotes' second-round pick went to the Anaheim Ducks as the result of a trade on June 20, 2008 that sent Dallas' first-round pick in 2008 (28th overall) pick to Phoenix in exchange for a compensatory second-round pick in 2008 (35th overall) and this pick.
The Florida Panthers' second-round pick went to the New York Islanders as the result of a trade on June 20, 2008 that sent Toronto's first-round pick in 2008 (7th overall) to Nashville in exchange for Florida's first-round pick in 2008 (9th overall) and this pick.
Nashville previously acquired this pick as the result of a trade on June 22, 2007 that sent Tomas Vokoun to Florida in exchange for Detroit's second-round pick in 2007, a first-round pick in 2008 and this pick.
The Chicago Blackhawks' second-round pick went to the Ottawa Senators as the result of a trade on July 9, 2006 that sent Martin Havlat and Bryan Smolinski to Chicago in exchange for Tom Preissing, Josh Hennessy, Michal Barinka and this pick.
The Edmonton Oilers' second-round pick went to the Anaheim Ducks as compensation for not matching an offer sheet from Edmonton to restricted free agent Dustin Penner on August 2, 2007.
 The Nashville Predators' second-round pick went to the Florida Panthers as the result of a trade on June 21, 2008 that sent Ottawa's second-round pick in 2008 (49th overall) and a fourth-round pick in 2009 to Phoenix in exchange for this pick.
Phoenix previously acquired this pick as the result of a trade on June 21, 2008 that sent Toronto's second-round pick in 2008 (38th overall) to Nashville in exchange for a third-round pick in 2008 (76th overall) and this pick.
The Calgary Flames' second-round pick was re-acquired as the result of a trade on June 20, 2008 that sent a first-round pick in 2008 (17th overall) and a second-round pick in 2009 to Los Angeles in exchange for Michael Cammalleri and this pick.
Los Angeles previously acquired this pick as the result of a trade on January 29, 2007 that sent Craig Conroy to Calgary in exchange for Jamie Lundmark, a fourth-round pick in 2007 and this pick.
The Ottawa Senators' second-round pick went to the Phoenix Coyotes as the result of a trade on June 21, 2008 that sent Nashville's second-round pick in 2008 (46th overall) to Florida in exchange for a fourth-round pick in 2009 and this pick.
Florida previously acquired this pick as the result of a trade on June 20, 2008 that sent Olli Jokinen to Phoenix in exchange for Keith Ballard, Nick Boynton and this pick.
Phoenix previously acquired this pick as the result of a trade on February 27, 2007 that sent Oleg Saprykin and a seventh-round pick in 2007 to Ottawa in exchange for this pick.
The Anaheim Ducks' second-round pick went to the New York Islanders as the result of a trade on July 5, 2007 that sent Allan Rourke and Edmonton's third-round pick in 2008 to Edmonton in exchange for this pick.
Edmonton previously acquired this pick as the result of a trade on July 3, 2006 that sent Chris Pronger to Anaheim in exchange for Joffrey Lupul, Ladislav Smid, a first-round pick in 2007, a conditional first-round pick in 2008 and this pick.
The Washington Capitals' second-round pick went to the New Jersey Devils as the result of a trade on June 20, 2008 that sent a first-round pick in 2008 (21st overall) to Washington in exchange for a first-round pick (23rd overall) and this pick.
The San Jose Sharks' second-round pick went to the Washington Capitals as the result of a trade on June 23, 2007 that sent Buffalo's first-round pick in 2007 to San Jose for Carolina's second-round pick in 2007 and this pick.
The Philadelphia Flyers' second-round pick went to the Washington Capitals as the result of a trade on June 23, 2007 that sent Carolina's second-round pick in 2007 to Philadelphia in exchange for Nashville's third-round pick in 2007 and this pick.
The Pittsburgh Penguins' second-round pick went to the Toronto Maple Leafs as the result of a trade on February 26, 2008 that sent Hal Gill to Pittsburgh in exchange for a fifth-round pick in 2009 and this pick.
The Detroit Red Wings' second-round pick went to the Colorado Avalanche as the result of a trade on June 21, 2008 that sent Brad Richardson to Los Angeles in exchange for this pick.
Los Angeles previously acquired this pick as the result of a trade on February 26, 2008 that sent Brad Stuart to Detroit in exchange for a fourth-round pick in 2009 and this pick.

Round three

Notes
The Tampa Bay Lightning's third-round pick went to the San Jose Sharks as the result of a trade on June 21, 2008 that sent a fourth and fifth-round pick both in 2008 (117th and 147th overall) and a third-round pick in 2009 to Tampa Bay in exchange for this pick.
The Columbus Blue Jackets' third-round pick went to the Philadelphia Flyers as the result of a trade on June 20, 2008 that sent R. J. Umberger and a fourth-round pick in 2008 (118th overall) to Columbus in exchange for Colorado's first-round pick in 2008 (19th overall) and this pick.
The Toronto Maple Leafs' third-round pick went to the Chicago Blackhawks as the result of a trade on June 21, 2008 that sent a third and fourth-round pick both in 2008 (72nd and 102nd overall) to the New York Islanders in exchange for this pick.
New York previously acquired this pick as the result of a trade on June 20, 2008 that sent a first-round pick in 2008 (5th overall) to Toronto in exchange for a first-round pick in 2008 (7th overall), a conditional second-round pick in 2009 and this pick (being conditional at the time of the trade). The condition – New York will receive a second-round pick in 2008 and a third-round pick in 2009 or a second-round pick in 2009 and a third-round pick in 2008, at the Islanders choice – was converted on June 21, 2008.
The Florida Panthers' third-round pick went to the St. Louis Blues as the result of a trade on June 19, 2008 that sent Jamal Mayers to Toronto in exchange for this pick.
Toronto previously acquired this pick as the result of a trade on February 26, 2008 that sent Chad Kilger to Florida in exchange for this pick.
The Vancouver Canucks' third-round pick went to the Anaheim Ducks as the result of a trade on July 25, 2005 where Anaheim transferred a third-round pick in 2006 and a second-round pick in 2007 to Vancouver in exchange for this pick. Vancouver received these picks as compensation for the Ducks signing of head coach Randy Carlyle.
The Chicago Blackhawks' third-round pick went to the New York Islanders as the result of a trade on June 21, 2008 that sent Toronto's third-round pick in 2008 (68th overall) to Chicago in exchange for a fourth-round pick in 2008 (102nd overall) and this pick.
The Edmonton Oilers' third-round pick went to the New York Islanders as the result of a trade on February 19, 2008 that sent Marc-Andre Bergeron to Anaheim in exchange for this pick.
Anaheim previously acquired this pick as compensation for not matching an offer sheet from Edmonton to restricted free agent Dustin Penner on August 2, 2007.
Edmonton previously re-acquired this pick as the result of a trade on July 5, 2007 that sent Anaheim's second-round pick in 2008 to the New York Islanders in exchange for Allan Rourke and this pick.
New York previously acquired this pick as the result of a trade on February 18, 2007 that sent Denis Grebeshkov to Edmonton in exchange for Marc-Andre Bergeron and this pick.
The Buffalo Sabres' third-round pick went to the Los Angeles Kings as the result of a trade on June 21, 2008 that sent the Rangers third-round pick in 2008 (81st overall) and Vancouver's fourth-round pick in 2008 (101st overall) to Buffalo in exchange for this pick.
The Carolina Hurricanes' third-round pick went to the New York Rangers as the result of a trade on July 17, 2007 that sent Matt Cullen to Carolina in exchange for Andrew Hutchinson, Joe Barnes and this pick.
The Nashville Predators' third-round pick went to the Phoenix Coyotes as the result of a trade on June 21, 2008 that sent Toronto's second-round pick in 2008 (38th overall) to Nashville in exchange for a second-round pick in 2008 (46th overall) and this pick.
The Colorado Avalanche's third-round pick went to the Florida Panthers as the result of a trade on February 26, 2008 that sent Ruslan Salei to Colorado in exchange for this Karlis Skrastins and this pick.
The New York Rangers' third-round pick went to the Buffalo Sabres as the result of a trade on June 21, 2008 that sent a third-round pick in 2008 (74th overall) to Los Angeles in exchange for Vancouver's fourth-round pick in 2008 (101st overall) and this pick.
Los Angeles previously acquired this pick as the result of a trade on February 5, 2007 that sent Sean Avery and John Seymour to New York in exchange for Jason Ward, Jan Marek, Marc-Andre Cliche and this pick (being conditional at the time of trade). The condition – Los Angeles fails to sign Jan Marek before the 2007–08 season – was converted.
The Washington Capitals' third-round pick went to the Philadelphia Flyers as the result of a trade on June 20, 2008 that sent a first-round pick (27th overall) to Philadelphia in exchange for Steve Eminger and this pick.
The Minnesota Wild's third-round pick went to the Anaheim Ducks as the result of a trade on June 10, 2008 that sent Marc-Andre Bergeron to Minnesota in exchange for this pick.
The San Jose Sharks' third-round pick went to the St. Louis Blues as the result of a trade on June 22, 2007 that sent a first-round pick in 2007 to San Jose in exchange for Toronto's first and second-round picks in 2007 and this pick.
The Philadelphia Flyers' third-round pick went to the Los Angeles Kings as the result of a trade on February 19, 2008 that sent Jaroslav Modry to the Flyers in exchange for this pick.
The Pittsburgh Penguins' third-round pick went to the New York Rangers as the result of a trade on June 21, 2008 that sent Alex Bourret to Phoenix in exchange for this pick.
Phoenix previously acquired this pick as the result of a trade on February 27, 2007 that sent Georges Laraque to Pittsburgh in exchange for Daniel Carcillo and this pick.

Round four

Notes
The Tampa Bay Lightning's fourth-round pick went to the San Jose Sharks as the result of a trade on June 21, 2008 that sent a fourth-round pick in 2009 and a fifth-round pick in 2010 to Los Angeles in exchange for this pick.
Los Angeles previously acquired this pick as the result of a trade on January 20, 2007 that sent Ryan Munce to Tampa Bay in exchange for this pick.
The Los Angeles Kings' fourth-round pick went to the Washington Capitals as the result of a trade on June 23, 2007 that sent a fourth-round pick in 2007 to Los Angeles in exchange for a sixth-round pick in 2007 and this pick.
The Columbus Blue Jackets' fourth-round pick went to the Boston Bruins as the result of a trade on June 21, 2008 that sent a fourth and fifth-round pick in 2008 (107th and 137th overall) to Columbus in exchange for this pick.
The Vancouver Canucks' fourth-round pick went to the Buffalo Sabres as the result of a trade on June 21, 2008 that sent a third-round pick in 2008 (74th overall) to Los Angeles in exchange for the Rangers third-round pick in 2008 (81st overall) and this pick.
Los Angeles previously acquired this pick as the result of a trade on February 25, 2007 that sent Brent Sopel to Vancouver in exchange for a conditional second-round pick in 2007 and this pick.
The Chicago Blackhawks' fourth-round pick went to the New York Islanders as the result of a trade on June 21, 2008 that sent Toronto's third-round pick in 2008 (68th overall) to Chicago in exchange for a third-round pick in 2008 (72nd overall) and this pick.
The Nashville Predators' fourth-round pick went to the San Jose Sharks as the result of a trade on June 21, 2008 that sent Toronto's fourth-round pick in 2009 and a seventh-round pick in 2008 (207th overall) to Nashville in exchange for this pick.
The Boston Bruins' fourth-round pick went to the Columbus Blue Jackets as the result of a trade on June 21, 2008 that sent a fourth-round pick in 2008 (97th overall) to Boston in exchange for a fifth-round pick in 2008 (137th overall) and this pick.
The New York Rangers' fourth-round pick was re-acquired as the result of a trade on June 21, 2008 that sent a fourth-round pick in 2009 and a seventh-round pick in 2008 (201st overall) to Nashville in exchange for this pick.
Nashville previously acquired this pick as the result of a trade on June 20, 2008 that sent Chris Mason to St. Louis in exchange for this pick.
St. Louis previously acquired this pick as the result of a trade on February 26, 2008 that sent Christian Backman to New York in exchange for this pick.
The Washington Capitals' fourth-round pick went to the Calgary Flames as the result of a trade on February 10, 2007 that sent Andrew Ference and Chuck Kobasew to Boston in exchange for Brad Stuart, Wayne Primeau and this pick (being conditional at the time of the trade). The condition – If Calgary does not re-sign Brad Stuart for 2007–08 NHL season they will receive a fourth-round pick in 2008 – was converted on July 3, 2007.
Boston previously acquired this pick as the result of a trade on February 1, 2007 that sent Milan Jurcina to Washington in exchange for this pick (being conditional at the time of the trade). The condition – Washington will receive a fourth-round pick in 2008 if Jurcina averages less than 20 minutes per game for the 2007–08 NHL season – the date of conversion is unknown.
The San Jose Sharks' fourth-round pick went to the Tampa Bay Lightning as the result of a trade on June 21, 2008 that sent a third-round pick in 2008 (62nd overall) to San Jose in exchange for a third-round pick in 2009, a fifth-round pick in 2008 (147th overall) and this pick.
The Philadelphia Flyers' fourth-round pick went to the Columbus Blue Jackets as the result of a trade on June 20, 2008 that sent Colorado's first-round pick in 2008 (19th overall) and a third-round pick in 2008 (67th overall) to Philadelphia for R. J. Umberger and this pick.
The Dallas Stars' fourth-round pick went to the Ottawa Senators as the result of a trade on June 23, 2007 that sent a fifth and seventh-round pick in 2007 and Phoenix's seventh-round pick in 2007 to Tampa Bay in exchange for this pick.
Tampa Bay previously acquired this pick as the result of a trade on July 2, 2006 that sent Darryl Sydor to Dallas in exchange for this pick.

Round five

Notes
The Phoenix Coyotes' fifth-round pick went to the Toronto Maple Leafs as the result of a trade on February 27, 2007 that sent Brendan Bell and a second-round pick in 2008 to Phoenix in exchange for Yanic Perreault and this pick.
The Florida Panthers' fifth-round pick went to the Toronto Maple Leafs as the result of a trade on February 26, 2008 that sent Wade Belak to Florida in exchange for this pick.
The Carolina Hurricanes' fifth-round pick went to the Columbus Blue Jackets as the result of a trade on February 21, 2007 that sent Anson Carter to Carolina in exchange for this pick.
The Boston Bruins' fifth-round pick went to the Columbus Blue Jackets as the result of a trade on June 21, 2008 that sent a fourth-round pick in 2008 (97th overall) to Boston in exchange for a fourth-round pick in 2008 (107th overall) and this pick.
The Calgary Flames' fifth-round pick went to the Montreal Canadiens as the result of a trade on June 20, 2008 that sent a first-round pick in 2008 (25th overall) and a second-round pick in 2009 to Calgary in exchange for Alex Tanguay and this pick.
The Montreal Canadiens' fifth-round pick went to the San Jose Sharks as the result of a trade on February 25, 2007 that sent Josh Gorges and a first-round pick in 2007 to Montreal in exchange for Craig Rivet and this pick.
The San Jose Sharks' fifth-round pick went to the Tampa Bay Lightning as the result of a trade on June 21, 2008 that sent a third-round pick in 2008 (62nd overall) to San Jose in exchange for a third-round pick in 2009, a fourth-round pick in 2008 (117th overall) and this pick.
The Philadelphia Flyers' fifth-round pick went to the New York Islanders as the result of a trade on December 20, 2006 that sent Mike York to Philadelphia in exchange for Randy Robitaille and this pick.

Round six

Notes
 The Florida Panthers' sixth-round pick went to the Tampa Bay Lightning as the result of a trade on February 27, 2007 that sent Nikita Alexeev to Chicago in exchange for Karl Stewart and this pick.
Chicago previously acquired this pick as the result of a trade on June 24, 2006 that sent Craig Anderson to Florida in exchange for this pick.
 The Boston Bruins' sixth-round pick went to the Colorado Avalanche as the result of a trade on June 23, 2007 that sent Calgary's sixth-round pick in 2007 to Boston in exchange for this pick.
 The Ottawa Senators' sixth-round pick went to the Chicago Blackhawks as the result of a trade on February 26, 2008 that sent Martin Lapointe to Ottawa in exchange for this pick.
 The Colorado Avalanche's sixth-round was re-acquired as the result of a trade on June 23, 2007 that sent Anaheim's third-round pick in 2007 to San Jose in exchange for a fourth and fifth-round pick in 2007 and this pick.
San Jose previously acquired this pick as the result of a trade on February 27, 2007 that sent Scott Parker to Colorado in exchange for this pick.
 The Anaheim Ducks' sixth-round pick went to the Boston Bruins as the result of a trade on January 2, 2008 that sent Brandon Bochenski to Anaheim in exchange for Shane Hnidy and this pick.
 The Minnesota Wild's sixth-round pick went to the New York Islanders as the result of a trade on February 26, 2008 that sent Chris Simon to Minnesota in exchange for this pick.
 The Montreal Canadiens' sixth-round pick went to the Dallas Stars as the result of a trade on September 30, 2006 that sent Janne Niinimaa and a fifth-round pick in 2007 to Montreal in exchange for Mike Ribeiro and this pick.
 The Dallas Stars' sixth-round pick went to the Chicago Blackhawks as the result of a trade on June 21, 2008 that sent a sixth-round pick in 2009 to Los Angeles in exchange for this pick.
Los Angeles previously acquired this pick as the result of a trade on December 10, 2007 that sent Evgeny Federov to Dallas in exchange for this pick.

Round seven

Notes
The St. Louis Blues' seventh-round pick was re-acquired as the result of a trade on June 21, 2008 that sent a seventh-round pick in 2009 to Los Angeles in exchange for this pick.
Los Angeles previously acquired this pick as the result of a trade on February 26, 2008 that sent Jean-Sebastien Aubin to Anaheim in exchange for this pick.
Anaheim previously acquired this pick as the result of a trade on December 14, 2007 that sent Andy McDonald to St. Louis in exchange for Doug Weight, Michal Birner and this pick.
The New York Islanders' seventh-round pick went to the San Jose Sharks as the result of a trade on February 26, 2008 that sent Rob Davison to New York in exchange for this pick.
The Buffalo Sabres' seventh-round pick went to the San Jose Sharks as the result of a trade on February 26, 2008 that sent Steve Bernier and a first-round pick in 2008 to Buffalo in exchange for Brian Campbell and this pick.
The Nashville Predators' seventh-round pick went to the Philadelphia Flyers as the result of a trade on June 18, 2008 that sent Vaclav Prospal to Tampa Bay in exchange for a conditional fourth-round pick in 2009 and this pick.
Tampa Bay previously acquired this pick as the result of a trade on February 26, 2008 that sent Jan Hlavac to Nashville in exchange for this pick.
The New York Rangers' seventh-round pick went to the Nashville Predators as the result of a trade on June 21, 2008 that sent a fourth-round pick in 2008 (111th overall) to New York in exchange for a fourth-round pick in 2009 and this pick.
The Anaheim Ducks' seventh-round pick went to the Tampa Bay Lightning as the result of a trade on February 26, 2008 that sent Jay Leach to Anaheim in exchange for Brandon Segal and this pick.
The Minnesota Wild's seventh-round pick went to the New Jersey Devils as the result of a trade on February 27, 2007 that sent Aaron Voros to Minnesota in exchange for this pick.
The San Jose Sharks' seventh-round pick went to the Nashville Predators as the result of a trade on June 21, 2008 that sent a fourth-round pick in 2008 (106th overall) to San Jose in exchange for Toronto's fourth-round pick in 2009 and this pick.
The Philadelphia Flyers' seventh-round pick went to the Anaheim Ducks as the result of a trade on June 21, 2008 that sent a seventh-round pick in 2009 to Philadelphia in exchange for this pick.

Draftees based on nationality

North American draftees by state/province

See also
2007–08 NHL season
2008–09 NHL season
2007–08 NHL transactions
2008–09 NHL transactions
List of NHL first overall draft choices
List of NHL players

References

External links
Official 2008 NHL draft page
Order of selection notes & trades
Ottawa Senators Draft Central page
2008 NHL Entry Draft player stats at The Internet Hockey Database

Draft
National Hockey League Entry Draft
Ice hockey in Ottawa